Aleš Dryml Sr. (born 10 June 1953) is a former speedway rider who competed in speedway, longtrack and grasstrack racing. He reached fourteen World Longtrack world championship finals finishing second in 1989 and 1991.

He rode in the top tier of British Speedway from 1978-1982, riding for various clubs.

He has two sons Ales and Lukas who both also compete in Speedway.

World Final appearances

Individual World Championship
 1980 -  Gothenburg, Ullevi - 12th - 5pts
 1981 -  London, Wembley Stadium - 14th - 3pts

World Pairs Championship
 1981 -  Chorzów, Silesian Stadium (with Jan Verner) - 4th - 18pts (12)
 1982 -  Sydney, Liverpool City Raceway (with Jiří Štancl) - 7th - 8pts (3)
 1984 -  Lonigo, Pista Speedway (with Jiří Štancl) - 6th - 10pts (5)

World Team Cup
 1977 -  Wrocław, Olympic Stadium (with Václav Verner / Jan Verner / Jiří Štancl) - 3rd - 23pts (5)
 1978 -  Landshut, Ellermühle Stadium (with Jiří Štancl / Václav Verner / Jan Verner) - 4th - 16+2pts (2)
 1979 -  London, White City Stadium (with Zdeněk Kudrna / Jiří Štancl / Václav Verner) - 3rd - 19pts (5)
 1980 -  Wrocław, Olympic Stadium (with Zdeněk Kudrna / Jiří Štancl / Václav Verner / Petr Ondrašík) - 4th - 12pts (1)
 1982 -  London, White City Stadium (with Jiří Štancl / Václav Verner / Petr Ondrašík / Antonín Kasper Jr.) - 4th - 17pts (7)
 1983 -  Vojens, Speedway Center (with Jiří Štancl / Václav Verner / Antonín Kasper Jr. / Petr Ondrašík) - 4th - 3pts (0)

Ice World Championship
1974 –  Nässjö, 16th
1976 –  Assen, 10th

Czechoslovakian Individual Speedway Champion
 1974  (18th) 6.5pts
 1975  (8th) 32pts
 1976  (17th) 9pts
 1977  (4th) 67pts
 1978  (5th) 60pts
 1979  (4th) 61pts
 1980  (4th) 67pts
 1981  (Second) 55pts (after run-off)
 1982  (Champion) 51pts
 1983  (Third) 47pts
 1984  (Champion) 75pts
 1985  (Second) 66pt

World Longtrack Championship

Finals
 1977  Aalborg (8th) 12pts
 1978  Mühldorf (10th) 10pts
 1979  Marianske Lazne (11th) 8pts
 1983  Marianske Lazne (6th) 14pts
 1984  Herxheim (7th) 10pts
 1985  Esbjerg (14th) 4pts
 1989  Marianske Lazne (Second) 37pts
 1990  Herxheim (12th) 10pts
 1991  Marianske Lazne (Second) 21pts
 1992  Pfarrkirchen (6th) 13pts
 1993  Mühldorf (6th) 13pts
 1994  Marianske Lazne (5th) 16pts
 1995  Scheeßel (8th) 17pts
 1996  Herxheim (15th) 4pts

Semi-finals
 1980  Gornja Radgona (11th) 7pts
 1982  Jubeck (16th) 3pts

Qualifying round
 1981  Harsewinkel (12th) 6pts

References

1953 births
Czech speedway riders
Living people
Sportspeople from Kolín
Individual Speedway Long Track World Championship riders
Exeter Falcons riders
Sheffield Tigers riders
Birmingham Brummies riders